Echinarachnius parma, the common sand dollar, is a species of sand dollar native to the Northern Hemisphere. 

Subspecies
 Echinarachnius parma obesus H.L. Clark, 1914
 Echinarachnius parma parma (Lamarck, 1816)
 Echinarachnius parma sakkalinensis Argamakowa, 1934

Distribution
It is found in the North Pacific and Northwest Atlantic, on the North American east coast from New Jersey north, as well as in Alaska, Siberia, British Columbia, and Japan.

Description
The entire shell is also covered with maroon-colored moveable spines. The color is a purplish brown, becoming bleached white when washed ashore. As in other echinoderms, five radial furrows branch from the mouth on the animal's underside.

This and other species of Echinarachnius have been around since the Pliocene epoch.

References

 Say, T. (1826). On the species of the Linnean genus Echinus, inhabiting the coast of the United States. Journal of the Academy of Natural Sciences of Philadelphia. 5, 225-229
 Gosner, K. L. (1971). Guide to identification of marine and estuarine invertebrates: Cape Hatteras to the Bay of Fundy. John Wiley & Sons, Inc. 693 p.
 Linkletter, L. E. (1977). A checklist of marine fauna and flora of the Bay of Fundy. Huntsman Marine Laboratory, St. Andrews, N.B. 68: p
 Mortensen, T. (1948). A Monograph of the Echinoidea. IV, 2. Clypeasteroida. Clypeasteridæ, Arachnoidæ, Fibulariidæ, Laganidæ and Scutellidæ. 471 pp., C. A. Reitzel, Copenhagen.
 Bromley, J.E.C., and J.S. Bleakney. (1984). Keys to the fauna and flora of Minas Basin. National Research Council of Canada Report 24119. 366 p
 Echinarachnius parma, Animal Diversity Web

External links
 Lamarck, J. B. M. de. (1816). Histoire naturelle des animaux sans vertèbres, Tome troisième [in full: Histoire naturelle des animaux sans vertèbres présentant les caractéres généraux et particuliers de ces animaux, leur distribution, leurs classes, leurs familles, leurs genres, et la citation des principales espèces qui s'y rapportent. [book series]. 586 pp. Paris: Deterville/Verdière.]
 Agassiz, L. 1841. Monographies d'Échinodermes vivans et fossiles. Échinites. Famille des Clypéasteroides. 2 (Seconde Monographie). Des Scutelles. Neuchâtel, Switzerland, i-iv, 1-151, pls 1-27
 Michelin, H. 1859. Notice descriptive de quelques espèces nouvelles d'Echinides, famille de Clypéasteroides, tribu Laganides. Revue et magasin de zoologie pure et appliquée, 2, vol. 11, 394-401.
 Say, T. (1826). On the species of the Linnean genus Echinus, inhabiting the coast of the United States. Journal of the Academy of Natural Sciences of Philadelphia. 5, 225-229
   Pollock, L.W. (1998). A practical guide to the marine animals of northeastern North America. Rutgers University Press. New Brunswick, New Jersey & London. 367 pp.
  Trott, T. J. (2004). Cobscook Bay inventory: a historical checklist of marine invertebrates spanning 162 years. Northeastern Naturalist. 11, 261-324

Clypeasteroida
Taxa named by Jean-Baptiste Lamarck